Ibirapuitã Environmental Protection Area is a protected area in the state of Rio Grande do Sul, Brazil. It is in the Uruguayan savanna ecoregion.

Location

It is administered by the Chico Mendes Institute for Biodiversity Conservation.
The area includes parts of the Alegrete, Quaraí, Rosário do Sul and Santana do Livramento municipalities of Rio Grande do Sul.
It is in the upper basin of the Ibirapuitã River, a tributary of the Ibicuí River.

Conservation

The area is classified as IUCN protected area category Ia, Strict Nature Reserve.
The primary purposes are to conserve a significant portion of the pampas biome, protect biological diversity and control human activities to ensure sustainable use of natural resources.

Protected species include the mussels Lamproscapha ensiformis, Mycetopoda siliquosa and Mycetopoda legumen.

Notes

Sources

Environmental protection areas of Brazil
Protected areas of Rio Grande do Sul
Santana do Livramento